Titanatemnus thomeensis is an endemic pseudoscorpion species of the family Atemnidae that lives on São Tomé Island. It was first described in 1906 by Edvard Ellingsen.

References

Endemic fauna of São Tomé Island
Invertebrates of São Tomé and Príncipe
Atemnidae
Scorpions of Africa
Animals described in 1906